Harry A. McEnroe (January 25, 1931 – February 8, 2021) was an American Democratic Party politician from New Jersey.

He made his first bid for public office in 1971, running for the New Jersey General Assembly in Essex County District 11E.  McEnroe and his running mate, Gerald Simons, were defeated by the Republican incumbents, Thomas Kean (the future Governor) and Philip Kaltenbacher.

McEnroe was elected to the Essex County Board of Chosen Freeholders in 1973, and was re-elected in 1976.  He did not seek another term in 1978 when Essex County changed its form of government.  He was elected to the State Assembly in 1979, and was re-elected in 1981, 1983, 1985, 1987, 1989, 1991, and 1993.   He lost his bid for re-election to a 9th term in 1995 when he was defeated in the Democratic primary by Craig A. Stanley by 612 votes. His defeat came after the powerful Essex County Democratic Organization withdrew their support of his re-election. In 2000, he endorsed Republican Bob Franks for U.S. Senate against the Democratic candidate, Jon Corzine. He served many years as the South Orange Democratic Party Chairman.

He died on February 8, 2021, at age 90, in Mantoloking, New Jersey.

References

1931 births
2021 deaths
Democratic Party members of the New Jersey General Assembly
County commissioners in New Jersey
Politicians from Newark, New Jersey